J. Richard Fredericks (born 1945) was the United States Ambassador to Switzerland and Liechtenstein from October 29, 1999, until July 6, 2001. He was appointed by President Bill Clinton. Born in Detroit, Michigan, Fredericks received a B.S. in Business Administration from Georgetown University and an M.B.A. from Columbia University.

Fredericks is a founding partner of Main Management, LLC. On December 3, 2010, Speaker Nancy Pelosi appointed Fredericks as a member of the trust fund board of the Library of Congress.

References

1945 births
Living people
Ambassadors of the United States to Switzerland
Ambassadors of the United States to Liechtenstein
American company founders
McDonough School of Business alumni
Columbia Business School alumni